{{DISPLAYTITLE:C7H7N}}
The molecular formula C7H7N (molar mass: 105.13 g/mol, exact mass: 105.0578 u) may refer to:

 Azocine
 Vinylpyridines
 2-Vinylpyridine
 3-Vinylpyridine
 4-Vinylpyridine

Molecular formulas